War Robots (previously titled Walking War Robots) is mobile app game developed and published by the game developer Pixonic. It is a third-person shooter with real-time PvP battles in Multiplayer Online Battle Arena (MOBA) mode. Players operate BattleTech-like robots on a live battlefield. They either have the option to play solo or team up with other players. It was first released on iOS in 2014 and was released to Android the following year.

In 2020, Pixonic merged the player pools from Google Play, Apple Game Center, and Amazon Game Circle into a combined-platform matchmaking system. They are working to integrate all game functions for this network.

Reception 
Engadget  Android Police reviewed the work, writing "Walking War Robots isn't exactly original - it's borrowing quite a lot from the MechWarrior series, with a third-person perspective and mobile controls thrown on. But as a high-end, team-based online multiplayer mech game on Android, it's also fairly unique to the platform." Droid Gamers was also mostly positive, noting that the "graphics could be a tiny bit more polished but then again you have 12 players on the field which is a no small feat and the details that they have included like smoke trails from missiles and the audio are immersive."

148apps.com gave a favorable review (4.5 stars out of 5) for War Robots, stating that "it's an interesting game that feels serious enough to be realistic. That's no small feat." A review by TechRadar stated that it was... "Fun and enjoyable. But needs more robots, weapons and a better reward system. App Spy also praised the game, writing that "The engine powering the game is impressive, even if some of the UI elements are a bit old hat, and the feeling of being part of a squad taking on another team is palpable."

References

External links 
 
 
 

2014 video games
Android (operating system) games
IOS games
Mobile games
Multiplayer video games
Video games about robots
Video games developed in Russia
YouTube sponsors
My.Games games